Don Fellows (December 2, 1922 – October 21, 2007) was an American actor known for his roles in British theater and television.

Born in Salt Lake City, Utah and raised in Madison, Wisconsin, Fellows served in the United States Merchant Marine during World War II. He was a graduate of the University of Wisconsin and a member of the Actors Studio. He moved to London in 1973 to further his stage career.

Fellows' TV appearances included Space: 1999, Z Cars, Lillie, The Sandbaggers, The Citadel, The Beiderbecke Tapes, The Bill and Inspector Morse.

His film appearances included Spy Story (1976), The Omen (1976), Twilight's Last Gleaming (1977), Valentino (1977), Licensed to Love and Kill (1979), Raiders of the Lost Ark (1981), Eye of the Needle (1981), Who Dares Wins (1982), Electric Dreams (1984), Superman IV: The Quest for Peace (1987) and Velvet Goldmine (1998).

He featured alongside fellow American expatriate actor Ed Bishop in the radio series The BBC Presents: Philip Marlowe.

In 1992, he played the part of Conn Kortchmar, an American GI,  in the Radio 4 drama The Archers.

Throughout his life, Fellows suffered from a stutter, which he was able to suppress while acting. He died in 2007, at the age of 84.

Filmography

 The Detective (1968) as Reporter (uncredited)
 Pretty Poison (1968) as Detective
 Symbiopsychotaxiplasm (1968) as Himself
 Trick Baby (1972) as Phillips
 Soft Beds, Hard Battles (1974) as Senior Counsellor (uncredited)
 The Spikes Gang (1974) as Cowboy
 Inside Out (1975) as U.S. Colonel
 The Omen (1976) as Thorn's Second Aide
 Death Play (1976) as Arthur
 Spy Story (1976) as Colonel Schlegel
 Twilight's Last Gleaming (1977) as Gen. Stonesifer
 Valentino (1977) as George Melford
 Lillie (1978, TV) as J. M. Whistler
 The London Connection (1979) as General
 Licensed to Love and Kill (1979) as Vice-President
 Ike (1979, TV) as Gen. Carl Spaatz
  Tales of the Unexpected (1979, TV) as Renshaw
 Superman II (1980) as General
 Raiders of the Lost Ark (1981) as Col. Musgrove
 Eye of the Needle (1981) as American Colonel
 Who Dares Wins (1982) as Ambassador Franklin
 Enigma (1982)
 Electric Dreams (1984) as Mr. Ryley
 Odin: Photon Sailer Starlight (1985) as Suzuka (1992) (English version, voice)
 Reunion at Fairborough (1985) as Duffy
 The American Way (1986) as Capt. War Hero
 Haunted Honeymoon (1986) as Producer
 Superman IV: The Quest for Peace (1987) as Levon Hornsby
 Patlabor: The Movie (1989) as Jitsuyama (1995) (English version, voice)
 Ekkusu (1996) as Nataku (English version, voice, uncredited)
 Velvet Goldmine (1998) as Lou
 The Man Who Cried (2000) as Joe

External links

Don Fellows at the University of Wisconsin's Actors Studio Audio Collection
 in The Times, November 21, 2007
Obituary in The Guardian, January 21, 2008

1922 births
2007 deaths
20th-century American male actors
21st-century American male actors
American emigrants to England
Male actors from Wisconsin
American expatriate male actors in the United Kingdom
American male film actors
American male television actors
American male radio actors
American male stage actors
Actors from Madison, Wisconsin
United States Merchant Mariners of World War II
University of Wisconsin–Madison alumni